John Lynn VC DCM (a.k.a. Jackie Lynn) (1887 – 3 May 1915) was an English recipient of the Victoria Cross, the highest and most prestigious award for gallantry in the face of the enemy that can be awarded to British and Commonwealth forces.

He was 27 years old, and a private in the 2nd Battalion, The Lancashire Fusiliers, British Army during the First World War when the following deed took place for which he was awarded the VC.

On 2 May 1915 near Ypres, Belgium, when the Germans were advancing behind their wave of asphyxiating gas, Private Lynn, although almost overcome by the deadly fumes, handled his machine-gun with great effect against the enemy, and when he could not see them, he moved his gun higher up the parapet so that he could fire more effectively. This eventually checked any further advance and the outstanding courage displayed by this soldier had a great effect upon his comrades in the very trying circumstances. Private Lynn died the next day from the effects of gas poisoning.

Lynn was also awarded the Cross of the Order of St. George, 4th Class (Russia).

His Victoria Cross is displayed at the Fusilier Museum, Bury, Lancashire.

John Lynn's original grave (now lost) was in Vlamertinghe Churchyard. A memorial headstone is in Grootebeek British Cemetery, bearing the inscription: WHO WAS BURIED AT THE TIME IN VLAMERTINGHE CHURCHYARD BUT WHOSE GRAVE WAS DESTROYED IN LATER BATTLES A PLACE IS VACANT IN OUR HOME THAT NEVER CAN BE FILLED.

References

Monuments to Courage (David Harvey, 1999)
The Register of the Victoria Cross (This England, 1997)
VCs of the First World War - The Western Front 1915 (Peter F. Batchelor & Christopher Matson, 1999)

British World War I recipients of the Victoria Cross
Lancashire Fusiliers soldiers
British Army personnel of World War I
Recipients of the Distinguished Conduct Medal
British military personnel killed in World War I
People from Forest Hill, London
1887 births
1915 deaths
Recipients of the Cross of St. George
British Army recipients of the Victoria Cross
Burials in Commonwealth War Graves Commission cemeteries in Belgium
Military personnel from London